Matthew Gilkes (born 21 August 1999) is an Australian cricketer who plays for New South Wales. He made his Twenty20 debut for the Sydney Thunder against the Perth Scorchers on 24 January 2019 during the 2018-19 Big Bash League season. He made his List A debut for New South Wales, on 30 September 2019, in the 2019–20 Marsh One-Day Cup. He made his first-class debut on 1 November 2019, for New South Wales in the 2019–20 Sheffield Shield season.

References

External links
 

1999 births
Living people
Australian cricketers
New South Wales cricketers
Sydney Thunder cricketers
People from the South Coast (New South Wales)
Cricketers from New South Wales